The Northwest Passage is a historical sea route between the Pacific and Atlantic Oceans, through the Arctic waters of Canada, Alaska, and Greenland.

Northwest Passage may also refer to:

Literature
 Northwest Passage (book), a 2013 illustrated children's book written by Stan Rogers and illustrated by Matt James
 Northwest Passage (novel), a 1937 historical novel by Kenneth Roberts

Music
 Northwest Passage (album), a 1981 album by Stan Rogers
 "Northwest Passage" (song), its title track
 Northwest Passage, a 1997 album by Oregon
 "Northwest Passage", a big band tune by Ralph Burns

Television 
 Northwest Passage (TV series), a 1958-1959 television series starring Keith Larsen and Buddy Ebsen
 "Northwest Passage" (Fringe), a 2010 episode of Fringe
 "Northwest Passage" (Twin Peaks) or "Pilot", a 1990 episode of Twin Peaks

Other arts, entertainment, and media
 Northwest Passage (film), a 1940 film starring Spencer Tracy and Robert Young
 Northwest Passage (newspaper), an underground newspaper of the 1960s
 The North-West Passage, an 1874 painting by John Everett Millais